Abu al-Mahasin Yusuf ibn Mohammed Yusuf al-Fasi (1530/1531 in Ksar-el-Kebir, Morocco – 14 August 1604 in Fes, Morocco) was a major figure of Moroccan Sufism and the founder of the Zawiya al-Fassiya in Fes.<ref>The New Encyclopædia Britannica: Micropaedia, ed. Encyclopædia Britannica, 1994, p. 691</ref> He belonged to the al-Fasi'' Family. He is notable for his influence on the whole of northwest Africa. In 1578 he took part in the famous Battle of Ksar El Kebir against the Portuguese. He is the father of Mohammed al-Arbi al-Fasi.

References

Year of birth uncertain
1604 deaths
Moroccan Sufis
16th-century Arabs